Richard Irving "Butch" Neal (June 20, 1942 – June 17, 2022) was a United States Marine Corps four-star general who served as Assistant Commandant of the Marine Corps (ACMC) from 1996 to 1998.

Biography
Richard I. Neal born on June 20, 1942, in Hull, Massachusetts. He was commissioned as a second lieutenant in the U.S. Marine Corps upon graduation in 1965 from Northeastern University, where he received a B.S. degree in History and Education. He later earned a Master of Arts degree in Education from Tulane University (1973).

Following completion of The Basic School and subsequently the Field Artillery Officer Basic Course at Fort Sill, Oklahoma, Neal was assigned to the 3rd Marine Division in Republic of Vietnam, where he served as a Forward Observer with the 3rd Battalion 9th Marines. He returned to Vietnam in January 1970, where he was assigned as an Infantry Battalion Advisor to the Vietnamese Marine Corps. Upon his return he attended Amphibious Warfare School.

In 1973, he served as the Commanding Officer of the 2d 155 Howitzer Battery, 2d Field Artillery Group at Camp Lejeune, North Carolina. Following a tour as head of the Company Grade Assignment Section at Headquarters Marine Corps, he attended the Marine Corps Command and Staff College. He served on the Air-Ground Exchange Program as S-3, Marine Aircraft Group 36, on Okinawa. Upon return from overseas, General Neal was assigned as the Head, Operations Division, Amphibious Warfare School, Quantico. He was promoted to lieutenant colonel in 1981.

In 1982, he was selected to attend the National War College in Washington, D.C. Upon completion of school, he returned to Camp Lejeune to command the 5th Battalion, 10th Marines. Neal was promoted to colonel in 1985 and was assigned to the United States Central Command, MacDill Air Force Base, Florida, as the Chief of Policy/Strategy Division and later as the Chief of the Special Projects Division in the J-5 Directorate.

Neal was assigned duty as Director, Amphibious Warfare School, Quantico in August 1988. While serving in this capacity he was selected for promotion to brigadier general in December 1989.

In July 1990, Neal was advanced to brigadier general and assigned duty as the Director, Manpower Plans and Policy Division, Manpower and Reserve Affairs Department. He served in this capacity until May 1992. From September 1990 to April 1991, he was assigned temporary duty as the Deputy for Operations at U.S. Central Command for Operations Desert Shield/Desert Storm.

Neal was assigned as the Deputy Commanding General, II MEF in June 1992. From June 1992 - August 1992, he served as Commanding General, Joint Task Force for Operations GITMO, a humanitarian relief effort for Haitian migrants at Guantanamo Naval Base, Cuba.

Neal was advanced to major general in April 1993, and assigned as the Commanding General of the 2nd Marine Division. In August 1994, he was assigned as the Deputy Commander in Chief/Chief of Staff, U.S. Central Command, MacDill Air Force Base, and advanced to lieutenant general in October 1994.

Neal was promoted to four-star rank on September 19, 1996 and assumed duties as the Assistant Commandant of the Marine Corps on September 27, 1996. He retired on November 1, 1998.

After retiring from the Marine Corps, Neal served on various corporate boards and was associated with intellectual property rights in the private sector and defense-related companies.

Awards
His personal decorations include:

Neal holds the Expert Rifle badge and the Pistol Sharpshooter badge.

Personal life and death
In 1967, he married Kathy McCann; they would later have three children. 

Neal died of complications from multiple strokes on June 17, 2022, three days before his 80th birthday.

References
Notes

Sources

External links

1942 births
Living people
United States Marine Corps generals
United States Marine Corps officers
United States Marine Corps personnel of the Vietnam War
Recipients of the Silver Star
Northeastern University alumni
Tulane University alumni
Assistant Commandants of the United States Marine Corps
Recipients of the Defense Superior Service Medal
Recipients of the Defense Distinguished Service Medal
People from Hull, Massachusetts
United States Marine Corps personnel of the Gulf War
Military personnel from Massachusetts